RHF may refer to:

 Regional health authority or Regionalt helseforetak, of Norway
 Ice Hockey Federation of Russia (Russian Hockey Federation)
 Residence Hall Federation at Virginia Tech campus
 Royal Highland Fusiliers
 Right heart failure or Right-sided heart failure
 RHF Productions, owners of brand Red Hot TV (UK)
 Rhythm Heaven Fever

See also

 
 
 RHFS (disambiguation)